Seneca is a city in and the county seat of Nemaha County, Kansas, United States.  As of the 2020 census, the population of the city was 2,139.

History

Seneca was founded in 1857. It was named after Seneca County, Ohio.  The first post office in Seneca was established in November 1858.  Seneca grew up along the wagon route from St. Joseph, Missouri to Oregon and California.  British explorer Richard Francis Burton en route to California in 1860 passed through town and noted: "... Seneca, a city consisting of a few shanties ..."  Seneca was a station on the Pony Express of the early 1860s.  The station was located in the Smith Hotel, at the present-day location of Fourth and Main Streets.  Seneca was incorporated as a city in 1870.

Seneca was home to minor league baseball. The Seneca team played the 1910 season as members of the Class D level Eastern Kansas League, finishing in 2nd place. The team played home games at City Park.

Geography

Demographics

2010 census
As of the census of 2010, there were 1,991 people, 908 households, and 509 families living in the city. The racial makeup of the city was 98.6% White, 0.4% African American, 0.2% Native American, 0.1% Asian, 0.1% Pacific Islander, 0.3% from other races, and 0.4% from two or more races. Hispanic or Latino of any race were 0.7% of the population.

There were 908 households, of which 21.8% had children under the age of 18 living with them, 47.6% were married couples living together, 6.3% had a female householder with no husband present, 2.2% had a male householder with no wife present, and 43.9% were non-families. 40.5% of all households were made up of individuals, and 22.7% had someone living alone who was 65 years of age or older. The average household size was 2.09 and the average family size was 2.84.

The median age in the city was 49.2 years. 20.2% of residents were under the age of 18; 4.8% were between the ages of 18 and 24; 18.3% were from 25 to 44; 28.7% were from 45 to 64; and 28.2% were 65 years of age or older. The gender makeup of the city was 48.5% male and 51.5% female.

2000 census
As of the census of 2000, there were 2,122 people, 897 households, and 539 families living in the city. The racial makeup of the city was 98.82% White, 0.42% African American, 0.05% Native American, 0.05% Asian, 0.05% from other races, and 0.61% from two or more races. Hispanic or Latino of any race were 0.66% of the population.

There were 897 households, out of which 27.9% had children under the age of 18 living with them, 52.7% were married couples living together, 5.5% had a female householder with no husband present, and 39.8% were non-families. 36.9% of all households were made up of individuals, and 23.4% had someone living alone who was 65 years of age or older. The average household size was 2.29 and the average family size was 3.06.

In the city, the population was spread out, with 25.5% under the age of 18, 6.1% from 18 to 24, 22.0% from 25 to 44, 19.4% from 45 to 64, and 27.0% who were 65 years of age or older. The median age was 42 years. For every 100 females, there were 86.6 males. For every 100 females age 18 and over, there were 84.6 males.

The median income for a household in the city was $31,288, and the median income for a family was $40,819. Males had a median income of $27,875 versus $16,944 for females. The per capita income for the city was $19,076. About 4.4% of families and 7.1% of the population were below the poverty line, including 6.8% of those under age 18 and 8.0% of those age 65 or over.

Education
The community is served by Nemaha Central USD 115 public school district.

Notable people
 Ira K. Wells, Judge, United States District Court for the District of Puerto Rico
 Edward White, Philippine–American War veteran and recipient of the Medal of Honor
 John Riggins, Pro Football Hall of Famer, won a Super Bowl with the Washington Redskins, named Super Bowl XVII MVP.

References

Further reading

External links

 City of Seneca
 Seneca - Directory of Public Officials
 Seneca city map, KDOT

Cities in Nemaha County, Kansas
Cities in Kansas
County seats in Kansas
1857 establishments in Kansas Territory